The Asymmetric Warfare Group was a United States Army unit created during the War on Terrorism to mitigate various threats with regard to asymmetric warfare. The unit was headquartered at Fort Meade, Maryland and had a training facility at Fort A.P. Hill, Virginia. The unit provided the linkage between Training and Doctrine Command (TRADOC) and the operational Army, and reported directly to the commanding general of TRADOC.

In March 2021, the AWG held a casing of the colors ceremony and officially deactivated.

Organization 
The Asymmetric Warfare Group was made up by a headquarters and headquarters detachment and four squadrons:
 Able Squadron (Operations)
 Baker Squadron (Operations)
 Charlie Squadron (Training)
 Dog Squadron (Concepts Integration)

Each squadron is commanded by a Lieutenant Colonel and subsequently divided into troops each commanded by a Major.

Mission 

The U.S. Army Asymmetric Warfare Group (AWG) provides global operational advisory support to enable U.S. Army forces to win against current and emerging asymmetric threats, and prepare for Large Scale Combat Operations (LSCO).

The key tasks of Asymmetric Warfare Group is: Advise, Scout and to Assist Doctrine, Organization, Training, Materiel, Leadership and education, Personnel, Facilities and Policy (DOTMLPF-P) Integration.

History 

The U.S. Army Asymmetric Warfare Group (AWG) was charged with identifying Army and joint force capability gaps to DOTMLPF-P, and developing solutions to those gaps. It further seeks to identify enemy threats and develop methods to defeat those threats.

2016 marks the group's 10th anniversary. In January, 2006, the AWG was established as a Field Operating Agency under the operational control of the Deputy Chief of Staff, G-3/5/7, Headquarters, Department of the Army. The AWG was activated on March 8, 2006, at Fort Meade, MD. The AWG was assigned to the TRADOC on November 11, 2011 as a direct reporting unit to the commanding general. The assignment to TRADOC enabled enhanced cooperation with the Army Capabilities Integration Center, Combined Arms Center, and the Centers of Excellence. Since 2011, AWG has experienced a significant growth in Operational Advisory support missions, and activated its third Operational Squadron in 2013. With this enhanced capacity, AWG provides observations, analysis, and solution development into both the operational and institutional forces of the Army. AWG's operational advisors deploy globally to complex operating environments to understand the current and emerging challenges to anticipate the character of future conflict. While their focus is on assisting the operating force, they ensure that any lessons learned are passed to the institutional Army for long-term integration and to enhance the development of our generating force.

AWG conducts vulnerability assessments to identify security risks for the Army, bridge the skill and knowledge gap between Special Operations Forces and the regular Army, and assists the Army in developing and implementing the Army Learning Model through AWG's unique instructing methods, or ASLTE, Adaptive Soldier Leader Training and Education.

Assessing current and emerging threats: AWG determines friendly force vulnerabilities and enemy threat capabilities and then develops programs of instruction to raise situational awareness and understanding of identified problems. AWG then seeks to integrate the programs of instruction into Combat Training Center (e.g., National Training Center) rotations, as well as in-theater JRSOI training. JRSOI is the process that transitions deploying or redeploying forces, consisting of personnel, equipment, and materiel into forces capable of meeting the CCDR's operational requirements or returns them to their parent organization or Service. In addition, AWG evaluates engagement tactics, techniques, and procedures, and works with the Fires Center of Excellence to institutionalize its findings. AWG has also created a compendium of ISIL techniques and procedures, probable scenarios, and ways to counter them, which are distributed in theater and are available through the Center for Army Lessons Learned (CALL). AWG developed a similar product addressing Russian hybrid warfare based on Ukraine.

Understanding a Complex Operating Environment: through AWG's support to Regionally Aligned Forces and Special Operations Forces, they identified the requirement to bring jungle skills back into the U.S. Army. AWG incorporated lessons learned into the 25th Infantry Division in Lightning Academy and created handbooks for CALL. In addition, observations and trend analysis from globally-deployed operational advisors identified the requirement to raise awareness of tunneling and subterranean operations. AWG created handbooks and references for distribution by CALL. AWG continuously deploys operational advisors in support of theater security cooperation plans and events to identify how the complex environment is changing around the world. A handbook was developed by AWG after working with Combined Joint Task Force – Horn of Africa to inform future leaders and planners of the operational challenges a CJTF has in an environment where the DoD is not the lead agency.

On October 2, 2020 it was announced that the Army planned to close the AWG by September 30, 2021. On May 13, 2021, the AWG officially deactivated.

References

External links 
 U.S. Army Asymmetric Warfare Group command
 United States Army Professional Writing Collection description of unit
 Official U.S. Army Asymmetric Warfare Group website
 STAND TO!
 

Groups of the United States Army
Warfare group